Street of Shadows may refer to:

 Street of Shadows (1937 film), a French film
 Street of Shadows (1953 film), a British film
 Street of Shadows (novel), a Star Wars novel
 "Street of Shadows" (The Twilight Zone), an episode of the 1985 television series The Twilight Zone